is a Japanese gravure idol and actress. In addition to appearing in numerous photobooks, she has played roles in television, film, and stage productions, including Gogo Sentai Boukenger, Karate-Robo Zaborgar, the horror drama series Hitokowa, and the stage adaptation of Umimachi Diary.

Biography
Yamasaki was born in Osaka, Japan. While in high school she represented Osaka in a national rhythmic gymnastics competition. In 2004 she won the Miss Magazine Special Reader Award in the annual Miss Magazine gravure contest. Yamasaki appeared in GoGo Sentai Boukenger and Chō Ninja Tai Inazuma!! SPARK as Shizuka of the Wind. After changing management companies in 2012, Yamasaki did not model for any photobooks for several years, only resuming photobook modeling after she turned 30 years old. In 2017 Yamasaki starred in a stage adaptation of the Akimi Yoshida manga Umimachi Diary. In 2018 a photo exhibition featuring  previously unpublished photos of Yamasaki was held at Tokyo Arts Gallery. Also in 2018 Yamasaki joined the cast of Hitokowa, a horror drama on the Hikari TV Channel.

Filmography
GoGo Sentai Boukenger (2006)Persona (2008) (2010)Karate-Robo Zaborgar (2011) (2012) (2018)Nishinari Goro's 400 Million Yen (2021)

Photobooks
 , Saibunkan Shuppan, 2005, 
 , Kodansha, 2005, 
 21, Gakushū Kenkyūsha, 2007, 
 , Futabasha, 2008, 
 , Shueisha, 2011, 
 , Wani Books, 2017, 
 re.'', Kobunsha, 2018,

References

External links
Talent Profile 

Japanese gravure idols
Japanese actresses
Japanese television personalities
Living people
1985 births
People from Osaka